Victor Guérin (15 September 1821 – 21 September 1890) was a French intellectual, explorer and amateur archaeologist. He published books describing the geography, archeology and history of the areas he explored, which included Greece, Asia Minor, North Africa, Lebanon, Syria and Palestine.

Biography
Guérin, a devout Catholic, graduated from the École normale supérieure in Paris in 1840. After graduation, he began working as a teacher of rhetoric and member of faculty in various colleges and high schools in France, then in Algeria in 1850, and 1852 he became a member of the French School of Athens. While exploring Samos, he identified the spring that feeds the Tunnel of Eupalinos and the beginnings of the channel. His doctoral thesis of 1856 dealt with the coastal region of Palestine, from Khan Yunis to Mount Carmel. With the financial help of Honoré Théodoric d'Albert de Luynes he was able to explore Greece and its islands, Asia Minor, Egypt, Nubia, Tunisia, and the Levant. He published many unknown Punic and Roman inscriptions from Tunisia, as well as a detailed map of the country.

He spent some time as a professor of foreign literature in Lyon and Grenoble, and in 1878 he joined the faculty of the Institut Catholique de Paris. He was a member of the Société des Antiquaires de France from 1862, and of the Légion d'honneur from 1866.

He died on 21 September 1891 in Paris.

Expeditions

Guérin visited the Holy Land eight times in 1852, 1854, 1863, 1870, 1875, 1882, 1884, and 1888. He won a French Academy of Sciences prize for his 7-volume Geographical, Historical, and Archaeological Description of Palestine. Much of Guérin's seminal work is spent in describing the ruins (khirbas) in those places he visited.

Works
 In his books Guerin writes about the identification and history of archaeological sites, often referring to passages from the Hebrew Bible, Greek mythology, and contemporary explorers and scholars such as Robinson and Titus Tobler. He also quotes from other Jewish sources such as the Mishna and Talmud, as well as Jewish travelers such as Benjamin of Tudela and Isaac Chelo. Guérin designed large scale maps to accompany the books, printed separately.

His published works include:
Description de l'île de Patmos et de l'île de Samos. (1856)
Voyage dans l’Île de Rhodes et description de cette Île. Paris (1856)
Voyage archéologique dans la régence de Tunis. 2 Bde. Paris (1862)
 

 
 
  

 
 . 
 . 
Jérusalem : son histoire, sa description, ses établissements religieux. Paris (1889)
La France catholique en Égypte. Tours (Neuausgabe, 1892)
La France catholique en Tunisie. Paris (Neuausgabe, 1893)

References

Amateur archaeologists
French archaeologists
1821 births
1891 deaths
Holy Land travellers
French expatriates in the Ottoman Empire
Palestinologists
Historical geographers